Torleif Hansen (born 5 October 1948) is a Swedish former professional motocross racer. He competed in the Motocross World Championships from 1970 to 1983.

Biography
Born in Upplands Väsby, Sweden, Hansen was one of the top riders in the Motocross Grand Prix World Championships during the 1970s. He competed in the FIM Motocross World Championships from 1970 to 1983. His best season was in 1978 when, as a member of the Kawasaki factory racing team, he finished second to Guennady Moisseev in the 250cc motocross world championships.

References 

Living people
1948 births
People from Upplands Väsby Municipality
Swedish motocross riders
Sportspeople from Stockholm County